Country Cabin is a historic log cabin and community center located near Norton, Wise County, Virginia. It was built in 1937, and is a one-story, chestnut log building measuring 20 feet by 40 feet.  The Country Cabin has been continually used
to promote traditional Appalachian heritage through music, dance, and cultural programs.

It was listed on the National Register of Historic Places in 1992.

References

Appalachian culture in Virginia
Event venues on the National Register of Historic Places in Virginia
Log buildings and structures on the National Register of Historic Places in Virginia
Buildings and structures completed in 1937
National Register of Historic Places in Wise County, Virginia